Sympleurotis is a genus of longhorn beetles of the subfamily Lamiinae.

 Sympleurotis albofasciatus Julio & Monné, 2005
 Sympleurotis armatus Gahan, 1892
 Sympleurotis rudis Bates, 1881
 Sympleurotis wappesi Julio & Monné, 2005

References

Colobotheini